Hakikat is the main Avar language newspaper, published in Makhachkala, Dagestan. 

Previous names: 
1979-1918: XӀакъикъат (Truth)
1918-1920: ХӀалтӀулел чагӀи (Working People)
1920-1921: БагӀараб байрахъ (Red Flag)
1921-1934: БагӀарал мугӀрул (Red Mountains)
1934-1951: МагӀарул большевик (Bolshevik of the mountains)
1951-1957: Дагъистаналъул правда (Dagestani Truth)
1957-1990: БагӀараб байрахъ (Red Flag)

Among the authors published by the newspaper was Rasul Gamzatov.

In 2009, deputy editor of the paper Malik Akhmedilov was shot to death; colleagues believed his murder was linked to his critical journalism that reported on government attempts to suppress political and religious "extremism" and his investigations into unsolved, high-level assassination of officials in Dagestan.

References 

Avar language
Newspapers published in the Soviet Union
Makhachkala
Newspapers of Dagestan